WashingtonVC is an early stage fund and incubator that grows companies through the exchange of complementary technologies and Marketing services. The firm was founded by Mike Mann and is currently managed by Adam Goozh.

WashingtonVC's portfolio of companies is loosely modeled after the Japanese "keiretsu" model of sharing resources, talent, and technology to deliver products and services across a broad range of industries, such as online media and marketing, software technologies, Telecommunications services, Domain name services and consumer Internet services. The firm is known for backing their companies with "premium" Internet domain names (i.e. iphone.com and software.com).

References

External links
 WashingtonVC.com

Venture capital firms of the United States